Katerina Nikoloska (born 30 December 1990) is an Macedonia judoka.

The first Olympic judoka to represent Macedonia, she competed at the 2016 Summer Olympics in Rio de Janeiro, in the women's 63 kg, where she was eliminated by Büşra Katipoğlu in the first round.

References

1990 births
Living people
Macedonian female judoka
Olympic judoka of North Macedonia
Judoka at the 2016 Summer Olympics
European Games competitors for North Macedonia
Judoka at the 2015 European Games